Yadwinder "Yadu" Singh  (born 30 December 1986) is an Indian professional basketball player.  He currently plays for Haryana Gold of India's UBA Pro Basketball League.

He debuted with the India's national basketball team in 2005 and played at the 2016 FIBA Asia Challenge in Tehran, Iran.

External links
 Asia-basket.com profile
 Realgm.com Profile

References

1986 births
Living people
Indian men's basketball players
Basketball players from Uttar Pradesh
Power forwards (basketball)
Basketball players at the 2010 Asian Games
Basketball players at the 2014 Asian Games
Asian Games competitors for India